The 2022 AMF Futsal Women's World Cup, also known as the Mundial AMF Futsal Femenino 2022, was the fourth edition of the AMF Futsal Women's World Cup. The tournament was held in Mosquera, Colombia from 24 to 30 October 2022. Twelve national teams from four confederations participated in the tournament.

Participating teams
Including host nation Colombia, 12 nations participated.

1.Teams that made their debut.

Knockout stage

Classification 9th–12th

Classification 1st–8th

11th place match

9th place match

Quarter-finals

5th–8th (Semi-finals)

Semi-finals

7th place match

5th place match

Third place play-off

Final

Final tournament team rankings

|-
| colspan="11"| 5th through 8th
|-

|-
| colspan="11"| 9th through 12th
|-

References

External links 

 

AMF Futsal Women's World Cup
International futsal competitions hosted by Colombia